Cryptosporangium cibodasense is a bacterium species from the genus of Cryptosporangium which has been isolated from leaf litter from the Cibodas Botanical Garden in Indonesia.

References 

 

Actinomycetia
Bacteria described in 2015